Sham Raj II  (born as Shamraj Bhalerao), (also popularly referred as Raja Shamraj Rajwant Bahadur),  (15 August 1898 – 10 June 1987), was an Indian noble who served as a member of H. E. H the Nizam's Executive Council. He was the first Hindu member in the executive council. Some of the ancestors of Sham Raj Bahadur were themselves peshkars (deputy ministers) and diwan (prime minister) to the Nizams and still earlier their family served at various points in their career to Shah Jahan, the Mughal Emperor. A member of the powerful Rai Rayan family, Sham Raj built a magnificent personal library inside his palace containing 45,000 rare books, which he later generously opened to public.

Born to a Hindu Brahmin family which traces its roots to Raja Krishnaji Pant, a watandar of Devagiri under Shah Jahan. Shamraj studied at Madrasa Aliya school and later in Nizam College. He was a childhood friend of the Nizam and was a staunch Nizam loyalist throughout his life.

Shamraj was a patron of arts, literature and music. Newspaper Editor of Bennett, Coleman & Company, Sir Francis Low says, "Raja Shamraj Rajwant is a lover of Art and Literature and his museum contains a valuable collection of Old Indian Paintings".

Early life
Shamraj was born into a noble Rai Rayan family on 15 August 1898 to Raja Lakshmanraj Bahadur in Hyderabad. The Rai Rayan family belongs to Deshastha Rigvedi Brahmin community. The surname of Rai Rayan family is "Bhalerao".

Family history
His family is the founder of the Dafter-e-Diwani (Department of Finance) in Hyderabad Deccan during Nizam ul Mulk Asif Jah I. Sham Raj II's great-great-grandfather, Rai Naro Pant, migrated from Delhi to Hyderabad with Asaf Jah I. Rai Naro Pant served as 2nd peshkar (deputy minister) of Hyderabad Deccan after his elder brother Rai Moro Pant's death in 1750, who was the first peshkar (deputy minister) of Nizam of Hyderabad Deccan during the reign of Nizam-ul-Mulk, Asaf Jah I.

Sham Raj II's great grandfather's father Raja Dhondoji Pant was the elder son of Rai Naro Pant and served as third peshkar (deputy minister) during the reign of Sikandar Jah. His great grandfather Sham Raj I served as the Prime Minister of the Hyderabad from 1795 - 1797. The family is famously known as Rai Rayan Family in Hyderabad, India.

Sham Raj completed his schooling in Madrasa Aliya and his college degree in Nizam College.

Regin

Quoting about the reign and the relationship between H. E. H the Nizam and Raja Shamraj Bahadur family, Author and former Mayor of Hyderabad city, K. Krishnaswamy Mudiraj in his book Pictorial Hyderabad, Vol . II says, 

During the reign of Sham Raj II, along with the hereditary Rai Rayan estate of worth around Rs.4,96,000, Sham Raj also held jagirs worth Rs.34,000,00.

Titles
On the birthday of H. E. H the Nizam (Mir Osman Ali Khan) in 1930, He honoured Raja Shamraj Bahadur with the unique title of "Rajwant".

Notes

References

Bibliography

Further reading

External links

Indian Hindus
1898 births
1987 deaths
Hyderabad State politicians
Indian monarchs
People from Hyderabad State